Judah or Yehuda is the name of a biblical patriarch, Judah (son of Jacob). It may also refer to:

Historical ethnic, political and geographic terms
 Tribe of Judah, one of the twelve Tribes of Israel; their allotment corresponds to Judah or Judaea
 Judea, the name of part of the Land of Israel
 Kingdom of Judah, an Iron Age kingdom of the Southern Levant
 History of ancient Israel and Judah
 Yehud (Persian province), a name introduced in the  Babylonian period
 Judaea (Roman province)

People
 Judah (given name), or Yehudah, including a list of people with the name 
 Judah (surname)

Other uses
 Judah, Indiana, a small town in the United States
 N Judah, a light trail line in San Francisco, U.S.
 Yehuda Matzos, an Israeli matzo company

See also

 Juda (disambiguation)
 Judas (disambiguation)
 Jude (disambiguation)
 Jews, an ethnoreligious group and nation originating from the Israelites and Hebrews of historical Israel and Judah
 Judas Iscariot, one of the 12 apostles